Gaius or Lucius Fulvius Plautianus (c. 150 – 22 January 205) was a member of the Roman gens Fulvia. As head of the Praetorian Guard, he was very influential in the administration of state affairs, and clashed with Julia Domna, the wife of Septimius Severus.

Plautianus was originally from Leptis Magna, southeast of Carthage (modern Libya, North Africa). He was a maternal cousin and long-time friend of the Emperor Septimius Severus. Plautianus' father was another Gaius Fulvius Plautianus, born c. 130, whose sister, Fulvia Pia (c. 125 - after 198), was married to Severus' father Publius Septimius Geta.

Plautianus was Praefectus vigilum (commander of the Vigiles in Rome) from 193 to 197.

Plautianus was appointed prefect of the Praetorian Guard in 197. Due to their friendship, Severus rewarded Plautianus with various honors, including a consular insignia, a seat in the Roman Senate and the Consulship of 203. During his consulship, Plautianus' image was minted on coins along with Severus' second son, Publius Septimius Geta.

He assisted Severus in administering the empire and became very wealthy and powerful. Severus made him his second in command. He was at odds with Julia Domna, the wife of the emperor, presumably for influence. In 202, Plautianus married his daughter, Publia Fulvia Plautilla, to Caracalla (Severus’ first son and co-emperor) in Rome. Plautianus had those who opposed him assassinated or executed. He became so powerful that Caracalla and his mother, Julia Domna, began to be concerned for successions. Aware of her reservations, Plautianus sought to disrepute, dishonor and disempower Julia. He had her servants and friends arrested and tortured in hopes of extracting some damaging testimony against her. He was unsuccessful in his efforts.

The aforementioned marriage between Caracalla and Plautilla was not a happy one - In fact, Caracalla loathed both her and her father, threatening to kill them after becoming sole emperor. When Plautianus discovered this, he plotted to overthrow Severus' family.

When Plautianus was accused of treachery against the imperial family, Septimius Severus summoned him to the palace. During the meeting on 22 January 205, Caracalla's men killed him. After his death, Plautianus’ property was confiscated, his name was erased from public monuments, and his son of the same name, his daughter and his granddaughter were exiled to Sicily. They were all strangled on Caracalla's orders in early 212.

Family 
He married Hortensia and had:
 Fulvia Plautilla
 Gaius Fulvius Plautius Hortensianus (c. 170 - executed, 212). He was married to Aurelia (born c. 170), daughter of Lucius Aurelius Gallus consul in 174.

References

Sources
 Ancientlibrary.com 
 Trajancoins.com
 Livius.org 
 Tertullian.org

150s births
205 deaths
Year of birth uncertain
Imperial Roman consuls
Ancient Roman generals
Plautianus, Gaius
2nd-century Romans
3rd-century Romans
Praetorian prefects
Generals of Septimius Severus